Pelochyta arontes is a moth of the family Erebidae. It was described by Stoll in 1782. It is found in Guatemala, Costa Rica, Panama, Peru, Venezuela, Paraguay, Trinidad, Ecuador, Suriname and Bolivia.

References

Pelochyta
Moths described in 1782